Kerrie Elizabeth Manley (born 15 January 1982) is a former footballer from Shrewsbury who played for the Welsh national team and Coventry City. Manley played predominantly as a centre back and accumulated over 30 caps for Wales.

Club career
Manley joined Birmingham City from Wolves Women in 2006, but suffered a facial injury on her first start for the Blues. She moved on to Bristol Academy during that season and remained there until 2009. She damaged cruciate ligaments in 2007 and again in January 2009.

After recovering, Manley began 2009–10 back at Birmingham City, then moved to Aston Villa during the campaign. She joined Nottingham Forest in November 2010, making a debut at Millwall Lionesses. Nomadic Manley joined Coventry City ahead of season 2011–12.

International career
Manley was eligible for the Wales women's national football team through her Welsh grandfather. She made her international debut, aged 24, in a 3–2 friendly defeat in Switzerland on 15 March 2006.

As a student at Manchester Metropolitan University Manley represented Great Britain in the 2007 Universiade in Bangkok.

References

External links
Kerrie Manley at UEFA
Kerrie Manley at FAW

1982 births
Living people
Bristol Academy W.F.C. players
Birmingham City W.F.C. players
Wales women's international footballers
FA Women's National League players
Sportspeople from Shrewsbury
Welsh women's footballers
Coventry United W.F.C. players
Nottingham Forest Women F.C. players
Women's association football defenders
Wolverhampton Wanderers W.F.C. players